Federica Felini (born 13 April 1983) is an Italian model, singer and television personality. Felini has modelled for Guess and has hosted the Sanremo Music Festival in 2005. She has also done a duet song with Italian rapper Vacca.

References

Living people
1983 births
Italian female models
21st-century Italian singers
21st-century Italian women singers